Viktor Kharitonin (Russian: Виктор Владимирович Харитонин) is a Russian billionaire. He is known to be close to Russian Deputy Prime Minister Tatyana Golikova and her husband Viktor Khristenko.

Biography 
Kharitonin made his fortune from the pharmaceutical firm Pharmstandard, which he co-founded with Roman Abramovich. Along with his partner, Egor Kulkov, Kharitonin listed the firm on the London Stock Exchange in 2008, but then they brought it back into private hands in 2016. In November 2021, Kharitonin and Kulkov acquired TSS group, a equipment manufacturing firm serving oil producers through Augment Investments. As of April 2022, Kharitonin's net worth is $2.8 Bn according to Forbes.

He resides primarily in Moscow. He graduated from Novosibirsk State University.

Sanctions 
He was one of the Russian billionaires, who haven't been sanctioned in 2018 or during 2022 Russian Invasion of Ukraine. However, Kharitonin allegedly avoided the sanction by relocating his firm Augment Investments, in which he has majority ownership, to Oktyabrsky Island from Cyprus, utilizing the Special Economic Region scheme of Russia.

See also 

 Pharmstandard

References

Russian billionaires
Novosibirsk State University alumni
Russian businesspeople in the United Kingdom
Living people
Year of birth missing (living people)